Eustachy Kajetan Sapieha (2 August 1881 – 20 February 1963) was a Polish nobleman, prince of the Sapieha family, politician, Polish Minister of Foreign Affairs, and deputy to the Polish parliament (Sejm).

Politics
In 1900–04, he studied forestry in Zurich and afterwards earned a degree as an engineer. He was a conservative activist from Kresy, and worked with the German installed Regency Council and Józef Piłsudski during the First World War. In 1917 he unsuccessfully negotiated with the Polish National Committee. Afterwards, disappointed with Piłsudski's leftist policies, he was an organizer of the failed 1919 coup d'état; despite that, he subsequently worked with Piłsudski and supported him. During the Polish-Soviet War, he served in the cavalry.

Diplomatic career
On 16 June 1919, Sapieha was delegated as the ambassador of Poland to the United Kingdom. On 4 June 1920 he and Erazm Piltz, representing the Polish government, signed the Treaty of Trianon in Paris.

In 1920, he was chosen by Prime Minister Władysław Grabski to be Minister of Foreign Affairs. Although he successfully negotiated several agreements with Western powers, he was faced with the delicate situation over the  plebiscites in Upper Silesia. On 24 March 1921 the British Embassy at Warsaw wrote to Earl Curzon in London to say that he had just called upon Prince Sapieha whom he found "very depressed at the result of voting in Upper Silesia, which has on the whole turned out far worse than the Polish Government had anticipated...He agreed with me that the victory reports in the newspapers were foolish and any public rejoicing regrettable." His negotiations over federation with Lithuania also failed and, faced with criticism from the National Democrats, he resigned his post later in the year.

Parliament and WWII
In 1928–29 he was a Sejm deputy from the Nonpartisan Bloc for Cooperation with the Government. After the Soviet invasion of Poland in 1939 he was arrested by the Soviets and imprisoned in the Lubyanka prison. After the Sikorski-Mayski Agreement, he joined Anders' Army. In 1941 he travelled to Kenya. He did not return to post-war communist Poland, and remained in Nairobi.

In 1956 he was awarded the Order of the White Eagle by the Polish government in exile.

References

1881 births
1963 deaths
People from Lviv Oblast
People from the Kingdom of Galicia and Lodomeria
Polish Austro-Hungarians
Eustachy Sapieha
Nonpartisan Bloc for Cooperation with the Government politicians
Ministers of Foreign Affairs of Poland
Members of the Sejm of the Second Polish Republic (1928–1930)
Ambassadors of Poland to the United Kingdom
People educated at Eton College
Polish people of the Polish–Soviet War
Polish people detained by the NKVD
Polish deportees to Soviet Union
Foreign Gulag detainees
Polish exiles
Recipients of the Order of the Star of Romania